Chapchha  is a town in Chukha District in northern Bhutan.

References

External links
Satellite map at Maplandia.com

Populated places in Bhutan